Trikauli is a village in Shahganj, Jaunpur district, Uttar Pradesh, India.

References

Villages in Jaunpur district